Thomas Jackson (1896 – after 1921) was an English professional footballer who played as an inside forward. Born in Sunderland, he started his career in non-league football with local side Sunderland West End before moving to Football League First Division club Burnley. He made one appearance for Burnley, starting in the 2–2 draw with West Bromwich Albion on 6 March 1920. He left to join Scottish outfit Dundee in January 1921 and stayed at the club for the rest of his career.

References

1896 births
Year of death missing
Footballers from Sunderland
English footballers
Association football inside forwards
Sunderland West End F.C. players
Burnley F.C. players
Dundee F.C. players
English Football League players
Scottish Football League players